Dan Lacey ( December 15, 1960 – February 7, 2022) was an American painter born in Brooklyn, New York, who was the self-described "Painter of Pancakes". His work commonly features popular culture icons (including Kanye West, Stephen Colbert, Michael Jackson, and Prince), politicians (including Joe Biden, Kamala Harris, Donald Trump, Hillary Clinton, Barack Obama, Bernie Sanders and Sarah Palin), and Internet memes, most notably, related to pancakes and cats.

Lacey's work has been widely featured in print news, social media  and television shows. Barack Obama and Prince were the frequent subjects in his works.

Lacey died from brain cancer on February 7, 2022, at the age of 61.

Notable works
Nude Justin Bieber painting owned by Macklemore.

References

1960s births
2022 deaths
Year of birth missing
Place of birth missing
21st-century American painters
21st-century American male artists
American male painters
Painters from New York City
Deaths from brain tumor
People from New York City